The St. George and St. Adalbert Church is the name given to a religious building of the Catholic Church located in Sillamäe a coastal city in Estonia, in Ida-Viru County (or Eastern Viru). As its name implies was dedicated to Saints George and Adalbert. This under the command of Father Grzegorz Senkowski and offers Mass in Russian and Polish due to which the congregation is composed of various nationalities present in Estonia.

See also
Roman Catholicism in Estonia

References

Roman Catholic churches in Estonia
Sillamäe